The Cinema of Ethiopia and the film industry in general is a relatively recent phenomenon in Ethiopia. The Ethiopian film industry is growing, but faces many problems that have prevented it from fully flourishing. Historically live stage theater enjoyed more popularity in Ethiopia, creating a handful of relatively successful stage actors. Ethiopian films began modernizing since 2000s, implementing Amharic language, but due to wide home video and DVD distribution, it often frustrated by copyright infringement in presence of piracy. This was reduced in early 2010s with an intervention of government and imposition of policy. Despite recently developing, the Ethiopian film production continued to be lack of complement quality in relation to world premiere with low budget amateurish style.

History
The cinema of Ethiopia was introduced in 1897, two years after the first world film was projected on 25 December 1895 in Paris. However the growth rate was critically declined as a result of ongoing sociopolitical instability. Over decades, the Ethiopian film industry was associated with cultural, religious and national background under pressure of its leaders, advanced historical and documentary films.

Berhanou Abebbé wrote in 2003 article Annales d'Ethiopie that a Frenchman introduced the first cinematic artifacts in Ethiopia in 1898, sold to Italian minister . Ciccodicola then offered to Emperor Menelik II as a gift. According to historians Berhanou and Richard Pankhurst books before the first public film screening occurred in (1909–1910), the Majesty watched several films over decades. In 1923, the first cinema house was completed and built by Ethiopians. Berhanou noted that the first cinema house called Pate was owned by MM. Baicovich from 1909 to 1910. During the first phase of cinema introduction, people were unsatisfactory to watch films. Berhanou quoted the French historian Merab, in his Impressions d'Ethiopie (1922), "people apparently didn't like to entertain themselves."

Pankhurst, a distinguished historian published his book Economic History of Ethiopia in 1968, further elaborated that the Armenians were attempted to project by 1909–10, but only attracted by temporary interest and soon abandoned it. Some natives misunderstandingly compared cinema to "devil work". Propelled by objection to the first house opened in 1923, the native labelled the cinema "Ye Seytan Bet" ("devil's house"). Chris Prouty noted that Ethiopia and Eritrea as the only country in Africa indifferent to foreign films. The first Ethiopian film au de Menilek was released on 1909 directed by Charles Martel. The first short film is 16mm black-and-white film, produced on the occasion of Empress Zewditu's coronation day in 1916. In addition, the coronation of Emperor Haile Selassie was filmed. There was also produced limited feature films. In 1978, the Ethiopian Film Center to encourage film production, which was later replaced by Ethiopian Film Corporation in accordance with Decree No. 306/1986. It was produced 27 documentaries; two of whom are notable titled BehiywetZuria and Aster. However with the regime of Derg caused a split of sector with private investment.

Little was known before internationally grossed films revived in 1990s. Most of renowned figures responsible for recognition of Ethiopian films internationally are Haile Gerima, Salem Mekuria, Yemane Demissie, and Teshome Gabriel. In 1993, the Ethiopian Filmmakers Association (EFIMA) was launched with objective of boosting the film growth in Ethiopia. At the time, the organization only have 27 founding members who were employees of the Ethiopian Film Corporation, the only public enterprise representing the film industry. The organization grew with 150 members representing five regions of the country. It has been called the pioneer association to bear filmmakers in Ethiopia.

In 2000s, Ethiopian films exceptionally outgrown and implemented Amharic language. However, with distribution to DVD, some filmmakers worried about piracy. According to Addis Ababa Culture and Tourism Bureau, there was an increase of production into from 10 to 112 films in 2005–2012. In 2013, the Ethiopian government planned with stakeholders of various working sectors to draft a new film policy. These include imposing license, expanding film schools, taxations, increasing equipments, and helping filmmakers to encourage production in culturally and diversify background. However scholars such as Aboneh Ashagrie and Alessandro Jedlowski argued that the Ethiopian films may never satisfied to international premiere because of filmmaking preference in amateurish style and differ from foreign norms. There are also internationally grossed films in particular; Difret (2014) and Prince of Love (2015) became the most acclaimed film whereas Rebuni (2015) and Yewendoch Guday (2007) were domestically successful films.

Notable figures

Directors 
 Haile Gerima 
 Abraham Haile Biru 
 Theodros Teshome
 Kidist Yilma
 Rasselas Lakew
 Yared Zeleke
 Zeresenay Mehari
 Hermon Hailay 
 Fitsum Asfaw
 Yared Shumete
 Mikyas Teka
 Henok Ayele
 Bereket Werede
 Yohannes Baye /Jani/
 Adanech Admassu
 Semagngeta Aychiluhem
 Dawit Shimelis
 Solomon Alemu Feleke
 Mesfin Getachew

Actors/actresses 
Meron Getnet
 Selam Tesfaye 
 Tizita Hagere
 Rasselas Lakew
 Makda Afewerk
Fryat Yemane
 Kidist Siyum
 Rediat Amare
 Abebe Balcha
 Addisalem Getaneh
 Eyob Dawit
 Alemseged Tesfaye
 Hanna Yohannes
 Daniel Tegegn
 Tariku Birhanu
Hanan Tarik
Amleset Muchie
 Ruta Mengistab
 Girum Ermias
Mahder Assefa
Liya Kebede
Solomon Bogale
Samson Tadesse
Tigist Girma
Mekdes Tsegay
Muhammed Muftahi
 Meseret Gebru
Ruth Negga
 Akrosia Samson
 Tensaye Yosef
 Frey Dagne
 Yohannes Ashenafi
 Sam Desu
 Yafet Henock
Senait Ashenafi
Zeritu Kebede
 Kassahun Fisseha
 Yigerem Dejene
 Tesfu Birhane
 Meseret Mebrate
 Tedros Kassa
Behailu Engida
Solomon Alemu Feleke

Screenwriters 
 Theodros Teshome
 Bereket Werede
Alebachew Aragie
 Yared Zeleke
 Zeresenay Berhane Mehari
 Hermon Hailay
 Semagngeta Aychiluhem
 Mesfin Getachew
 Kidst Yilma
 Fitsum Asfaw

Notable films

Domestically successful films 
 Kezkaza Wolafen (ቀዝቃዛ ወላፈን)
 Abay vs Vegas (አባይ ወይስ ቬጋስ)
 Sost Maezen  (ሶስት ማእዘን)
 Taza (ታዛ)
 Beza (ቤዛ)
 Yewendoch Guday (የወንዶች ጉዳይ)
 Balekelem Helmoch (ባለቀለም ህልሞች)
 Hiroshima (ሂሮሽማ)
 Rebuni (ረቡኒ)
 Kerbie (ከርቤ)

Internationally successful films 
Difret
 Lamb
 Triangle: Going to America (ሶስት ማእዘን1
 Triangle: Peak of intimacy (ሶስት ማእዘን2
 Selanchi 
 Teza
 The Athlete
 The Price of Love
Lambadina
 Harvest: 3,000 Years
 Blood Is Not Fresh Water
 Running Against the Wind

Major events

Festivals 
 Addis International Film Festival – This festival is held annually in Addis Ababa, and seeks to provide a platform for both amateur and professional filmmakers. It was created in 2007. 
 Ethiopian International Film Festival – annually held in Addis Ababa during which many Ethiopian film makers get to showcase their work and awards are handed to the best films as voted by the judges. This festival was started in 2005.

Awards 
 Gumma Film Awards – The most known and prestigious award in the Ethiopian film industry. Held in Addis Ababa, Ethiopia annually, this award show started in 2014 and is the first film award show to be broadcast live on some television channels.

Cinema-related organizations

Film schools 
 Blue Nile Film and Television Academy
 Yofthahe Nigussie School of Theatrical Arts
 Addis Ababa University Visual and Performing Arts
 Sami-Multimedia Film and Photography School (Adama, Oromia)

Notable movie theatres
 Sebastopol Cinema
 Gast Cinema
 Alem Cinema 
 Century Cinema
 Agona Cinema
 Mati Multiplex

References